Sarif may refer to:
 Şərif, Azerbaijan
 Sarif Industries, a fictional company featured in the 2011 video game Deus Ex: Human Revolution
 Static Analysis Results Interchange Format, a file format standardized by OASIS